The painted buttonquail (Turnix varius) is a species of buttonquail, the family Turnicidae, which resemble, but are unrelated to, the quails of Phasianidae. This species is resident in Australia where numbers are believed to be in decline. A subspecies, the Abrolhos painted buttonquail (Turnix varius scintillans), is endemic to the Houtman Abrolhos islands.

Taxonomy 
The painted buttonquail was first described by the English ornithologist John Latham in 1801 under the binomial name Perdix varia. 

"Painted buttonquail" has been designated the official name by the International Ornithologists' Union (IOC).

Two subspecies are recognised.

The possibly-extinct New Caledonian buttonquail (Turnix novaecaledoniae) of New Caledonia was formerly considered conspecific, but was split as a distinct species by the IOC in 2021.

Description 

It is a ground-dwelling bird and is found in grassy forests and woodlands. It feeds on insects and seeds, and the males incubate the eggs for a fortnight and then care for the young.

The female is the more brightly coloured of the sexes.  Her eyes are red, and her crown, face and breast are flecked with white.  Her shoulders are chestnut with thin white streaking above them.  The male is slightly smaller and duller in colour.

Distribution and habitat 
The painted buttonquail is native to Australia. Its range extends from Queensland southwards to New South Wales, Victoria, South Australia and Tasmania. A separate population is present in the southwestern part of Western Australia. The subspecies Turnix varius scintillans is endemic to the Houtman Abrolhos islands off the west coast of Australia. 

The painted buttonquail became established on Rottnest Island around 2002.

Status 
The painted buttonquail has a wide range. An estimate of the population size has not been made but numbers are suspected to be in decline. It is said to be common in suitable habitat in some areas and uncommon in others. The IUCN has listed it as being of "Least Concern".

References

External links 
 
 
 Painted buttonquail (Turnix varius) (Latham, 1801) Avibase 2009

painted buttonquail
Endemic birds of Australia
painted buttonquail
Taxa named by John Latham (ornithologist)